Sarah Martin Clemmons is an American college administrator and president of Chipola College, the first woman to serve in that role.

Early life and education 
Sarah Clemmons was raised in Marianna, Florida. She graduated from Marianna High School, Chipola College, University of West Florida, and Florida State University College of Education (FSU). Clemmons completed a doctor of philosophy from FSU in 1980. Her dissertation was titled Identification of writing competencies needed by secondary students to perform assignments in science and social studies classes. Her doctoral advisor was John S. Simmons.

Career 
Clemmons joined Chipola College in 1979 as an English instructor. She later became the chair of the literature/language division. Clemmons assisted in the formation of the Academic Center for Excellence, a tutoring program that won the Best Practice Award from the Florida College System Chancellor and was a finalist for a Bellwether Award. Clemmons played a role in establishing bachelor's degree programs in 2003. She revived the Phi Theta Kappa and Brain Bowl programs at Chipola. She was the Senior Vice President of Instruction for 15 years prior to 2016. As the chief academic officer, Clemmons oversaw Chipola's accreditation, grants, and the evaluation of its academic support programs. In October 2016, she began serving as interim president, replacing her predecessor, Jason Hurst. Clemmons became the president of Chipola in 2017. She is the first woman and second alumnus to serve as the president of Chipola.

Clemmons serves on the board of trustees of Jackson Hospital. She is a past chair of the Jackson County Chamber of Commerce Board of Directors.

Awards and honors 
Clemmons was named Citizen of the Year by the Jackson County Chamber of Commerce in 2015.

Personal life 
Clemmons is married to Tracy Clemmons, an operations management consultant at the Florida Agency for Persons with Disabilities. Their son, Martin Clemmons, works at Archbold Medical Center in Thomasville, Georgia as an internal medicine physician. Their daughter, Sarah Kathryn Dugan is a prosecuting assistant state's attorney in Tallahassee, Florida. Clemmons is active in the First Baptist Church in Marianna.

See also 

 List of women presidents or chancellors of co-ed colleges and universities

References 

Living people
Year of birth missing (living people)
People from Marianna, Florida
Chipola College alumni
University of West Florida alumni
Florida State University alumni
Heads of universities and colleges in the United States
American women academics
20th-century American educators
21st-century American educators
Baptists from Florida
Women heads of universities and colleges
20th-century American women educators
21st-century American women educators